New York Mary was an American jazz/rock fusion group, which released two albums on Arista/Freedom Records in 1976.  A Piece of the Apple was produced by Michael Cuscuna and Don Elliot.  It also features guitarist Gene Bertoncini.

Discography

New York Mary
"New York Mary"
"South Philly Willy"
"Hip City Slicker"
"Feet First"
"Sunrise"
"Shooby"

Bruce Johnstone: Baritone Sax, Alto Sax, Soprano Sax 
Rick Petrone: Bass, Electric Bass
Joe Corsello: Drums and Percussion
Allan Zavod: Keyboards
Donald Hahn: Trumpet
Tim Breen: Electric Guitar

A Piece of the Apple
"Rush Hour"
"Back to Being One"
"Midnight to Magic"
"Zoo Mouth"
"Mr. Mystery"
"Just as Long as We Have Love"
"(Walkin' Down) Greasy Street"
"Aftermath"

Bruce Johnstone: Baritone Sax, Alto Sax, Flute 
Rick Petrone: Electric Bass, Phaser Bass
Joe Corsello: Drums and Percussion
Ron Friedman: Trumpet, Electric Trumpet, Flugelhorn
Robert Aries: Electric Piano, Synthesizer
Don Elliott Singers on Tracks 3,5 and 8
Gene Bertoncini: Electric Guitar on Tracks 2,6 and 7
Pete Levin: Clavinet And synthesizer on Track 1

External links
A Piece of the Apple at discogs
Allmusic entry

Freedom Records artists
American jazz ensembles
American funk musical groups
American soul musical groups
American rock music groups
Jazz fusion ensembles
American jazz-rock groups